Muravanaya Ashmyanka is the village in the Hrodna Voblast of Belarus, located 11 km NW from Ashmyany and 28 km from railway station Ashmyany. In 1999, there were 338 villagers and 134 dwellings.

The village is the administrative center of the local rural council and collective farm, has a hospital and a high school. There still remains the ruined printing house, which was owned in beginning of the 17th century by Krzysztof Dorohostajski, and was the printing place of the Salinarius "Censura" in 1615 (the brick building completed possibly in 1590, converted to the palace residence in the 19th century). Also, there's Catholic church of Virgin Mary (wooden structure with a belltower, example of Baroque and Classicism and of folk wooden architecture; built in the end of the 18th — beginning of the 19th century, renewed in 1841 and 1874). During World War II (around May 1944) the village was the site of a battle between  Polish resistance and Lithuanian auxiliary Local Lithuanian Detachment.

References
 Belarusian Encyclopedia, Vol.11, 2000; Collection of Historical and Cultural Artifacts of Belarus, Hrodna Voblast volume, 1986.

Villages in Belarus
Vilnius Voivodeship
Oshmyansky Uyezd
Wilno Voivodeship (1926–1939)